The Hours of Love is a 1963 Italian comedy drama film directed by Luciano Salce.

Cast 

 Ugo Tognazzi as Gianni
 Emmanuelle Riva as Maretta
 Barbara Steele as Leila
 Umberto D'Orsi as Ottavio
 Mara Berni as Mrs. Cipriani
 Brunello Rondi as Cipriani 
 Diletta D'Andrea as Mimma
 Mario Brega

Release
The Hours of Love opened in Rome in March 1963 as Le ore dell'amore. It opened in New York on 2 September 1965.

References

External links

1963 films
Italian comedy-drama films
1963 comedy-drama films
Films directed by Luciano Salce
1960s Italian films